John McDermott may refer to:
John McDermott (boxer) (born 1980), British boxer
John McDermott (English footballer) (born 1969), former Grimsby Town footballer
John McDermott (Gaelic footballer), former Meath Gaelic footballer
 John McDermott (director) (1893–1946), American film director and screenwriter
John McDermott (Australian footballer) (1872–1925), Australian rules footballer
John McDermott (golfer) (1891–1971), American golfer
John McDermott (American artist) (1919–1977), American illustrator and author
John McDermott (runner) (1880–1948), American marathoner
John McDermott (singer) (born 1955), Scottish-Canadian singer
John F. McDermott, American psychiatrist
John J. McDermott (philosopher) (1932–2018), distinguished professor at Texas A&M University
John McDermott (Scottish artist) (born 1957), Scottish artist and veteran affairs activist

See also
Jack McDermott (1906–1958), Irish trade unionist
John MacDermott (disambiguation)